The Canal Zone tree frog (Boana rufitela)  is a species of frog in the family Hylidae found in the Caribbean lowlands of eastern Nicaragua, Costa Rica, and central Panama, as well as the Pacific lowlands of Colombia, although the latter records are uncertain and may refer to Boana rosenbergi.

Description
Boana rufitela is a medium-sized tree frog. Males measure  in snout–urostyle length and females . It is green above, with profuse, tiny, dark punctations and usually scattered dark spots. Fingers are about one-half and toes three-fourths webbed. Males have a distinct pollex rudiment bearing a spine.

Habitat
Its natural habitats are humid lowland forests. It tolerates some disturbance and can be found in open areas close to forest. Breeding takes place in swamps surrounded by trees. It is a locally common tree frog in the appropriate habitat.

References

Boana
Amphibians of Colombia
Amphibians of Costa Rica
Amphibians of Nicaragua
Amphibians of Panama
Amphibians described in 1961
Taxonomy articles created by Polbot